The 2008 NFL season was the 89th regular season of the National Football League (NFL), themed with the slogan "Believe in Now."

Super Bowl XLIII, the league's championship game, was at Raymond James Stadium in Tampa, Florida, on February 1, 2009, with the Pittsburgh Steelers coming out victorious over the Arizona Cardinals and winning their NFL-record sixth Vince Lombardi Trophy.

Conversely, the Detroit Lions became the first NFL team with a winless season since the strike-shortened 1982 NFL season, finishing their season 0–16. For the first time since the NFL expanded to the sixteen-game season in 1978, three teams won two or fewer games: the Lions, the Kansas City Chiefs, and the St. Louis Rams. Previously two teams won two or fewer games in 1979, 1981, 1983, 1985, 1992, and 2001. Also, for the first time since the 1985 Denver Broncos, a team finishing with an 11–5 record missed the playoffs- the defending AFC champion New England Patriots. Also, for the first time, two divisions (the NFC East and the NFC South) had no team finish with a losing record.

The regular season began on September 4 with the defending Super Bowl XLII champion New York Giants defeating the Washington Redskins.

Draft
The 2008 NFL Draft was held from April 26 to 27, 2008 at New York City's Radio City Music Hall. With the first pick, the Miami Dolphins selected offensive tackle Jake Long from the University of Michigan.

New referees
Gerald Austin and Larry Nemmers retired. Carl Cheffers and Alberto Riveron were promoted to referee. Ron Blum also retired from line judge position.

Rule changes
The following rule changes were passed at the league's annual owners’ meeting in Palm Beach, Florida, during the week of March 31:
One defensive player will be allowed to wear a radio similar to the one worn by the quarterback to communicate with the coaching staff on the field.
The "force-out" rule on catches made near the sidelines has been eliminated. A receiver now must come down with the ball and both feet in bounds for a pass to be ruled complete; previously, passes would be ruled complete if the receiver was pushed by a defender while in the air and the official judged that he would have come down in bounds had he not been pushed. However, if a receiver is wrapped up in mid-air by a defender and carried out of bounds before both feet touch the ground, the official can still rule the play a completion.
The 5-yard incidental grabbing of the face mask penalty has been eliminated; incidental contact will not result in a penalty, though intentional grabbing of the face mask will remain a 15-yard personal foul.
Teams that win the opening coin toss now have the option to defer the decision until the start of the second half, the same as in college and Canadian football.
Field goal attempts that bounce off the goal post are now reviewable under instant replay. This change followed a decision during the previous season during a Browns-Ravens game when Phil Dawson’s game-tying field goal hit an upright and then the curved support behind the crossbar, and then again went over the crossbar to land in front of the goal post.
Legal forward hand offs that touch the ground and attempted snaps when the ball hits the ground before the quarterback touches it are now considered fumbles; previously, forward hand offs were treated as incomplete passes, while a snap that hit the ground before the quarterback touched it was a 5-yard illegal procedure penalty.

Preseason
In preseason games, the annual Pro Football Hall of Fame Game was played August 3 between the Indianapolis Colts and Washington Redskins, which aired on NBC. Washington won the game, 30–16. Other preseason highlights included the first game of the Toronto Series, which was played August 14 between the Buffalo Bills and the Pittsburgh Steelers at Toronto's Rogers Centre. The Bills won that game, 24–21.

Regular season

Formula
Based on the NFL's scheduling formula, the intraconference and interconference matchups for 2008 were:

Opening Weekend
The annual NFL Kickoff Game to start the season took place on September 4 and featured the Super Bowl XLII champion New York Giants winning over their division rivals, the Washington, at Giants Stadium by a score of 16–7. The game's kickoff was ninety minutes earlier than previous years, at 7 p.m. EDT, because of a time conflict with the 2008 Republican National Convention.

Other featured games during the opening week included the NBC Sunday Night Football game between the Chicago and the Indianapolis (the first regular season game at Lucas Oil Stadium and a rematch of Super Bowl XLI), in which the Kyle Orton-led Bears upset the Colts 29–13. In addition, there were two Monday Night Football contests, both division rivalries, as part of the now annual doubleheader: The Minnesota at the Green Bay (the Packers’ first Monday night game without Brett Favre since 1992) in which Aaron Rodgers helped the Packers win, 24–19, and the Denver at the Oakland, where Jay Cutler and Eddie Royal led the Broncos in beating the Raiders, 41–14. Also, New England quarterback Tom Brady suffered a season-ending injury against Kansas City.

Flexible scheduling
The 2008 season also was the third season of the use of the "flexible scheduling" for Sunday games starting with Week 11.

As had happened in 2007, a team played on consecutive Sunday nights due to a game being moved into the Sunday night time slot. The originally scheduled New York Giants-Dallas game on December 14 was followed by a flexed December 21 home game for the Giants against the Carolina; the Giants-Panthers game was flexed because it carried serious playoff implications, as the winner would clinch the NFC's top seed and home-field advantage throughout the playoffs. This was the second of three flexed games, with a December 7 interconference matchup between the Baltimore and Washington. The league filled the open spot on December 28 with a game between the Denver and San Diego with major playoff implications, as the winner of that game would win the AFC West and earn a home game in the playoffs while the loser would be eliminated.

International play
This was the second consecutive season that the league played at least one regular season game outside the United States as part of the NFL International Series. The contest between the San Diego and the New Orleans was played at Wembley Stadium in London on October 26, with New Orleans winning 37–32. The Chargers played at Buffalo the week beforehand on October 19 so they could immediately travel to London afterward in order to get used to the time difference.

The league has also approved the Bills’ request to play at least one regular season home game at Toronto's Rogers Centre over each of the next five seasons. Team owner Ralph Wilson petitioned the league to play at least one game in Canada to strengthen his club's fan base in Ontario.  The game in Toronto was on December 7, after the end of the 2008 CFL season, against the Miami; Miami won 16–3. CBS televised both games regionally; the Toronto game was carried across Canada on Rogers Sportsnet and City TV.

Thanksgiving
The traditional Thanksgiving Day games were held on November 27, with the Detroit hosting the Tennessee at 12:30 PM EST on CBS (with the then 10–1 Titans handily defeating the then 0–11 Lions by a 47–10 score), and the Dallas a home game following suit on Fox at 4:15 PM EST against the Seattle (Dallas Cowboys defeated the Seattle Seahawks by a score of 34–9). A third game on NFL Network, featuring the Arizona and the Philadelphia followed at 8:15 PM EST. It was the first home game for the Eagles on Thanksgiving Day since 1940, and their first Thanksgiving game at any location since the infamous Bounty Bowl Game in 1989; the Eagles defeated the Cardinals by a score of 48–20. (The Cardinals and Eagles would, two months later, rematch in the NFC Championship Game, with Arizona winning this time by a score of 32–25.)

Christmas
Despite NFL tradition to play games on Christmas if the holiday lands on a day of the week when the NFL normally plays, and the fact that Christmas landed on a Thursday in 2008, the NFL opted not to hold a Christmas game this season, instead scheduling all of its week 17 matchups for Sunday, December 28.

Pro Bowl
The NFL's Pro Bowl all-star game at the end of the season was played at Aloha Stadium in the Honolulu, Hawaii, for the 30th consecutive season. The league had the option under their current contract to hold the game elsewhere, including the possibility of moving it to the host site of the Super Bowl.

Schedule changes
Week 2: The Baltimore–Houston game, originally scheduled for Sunday at 4:15 p.m. ET, was postponed to Monday at 8:30 p.m. ET due to Hurricane Ike. The game was later postponed to November 9 at 1:00 p.m. ET on CBS.

Week 10: The Cincinnati–Houston game, originally scheduled for Sunday at 1:00 p.m. ET, was rescheduled to October 26 at 4:05 p.m. ET on CBS, to accommodate the Baltimore–Houston game from Week 2.

Week 11: The Tennessee–Jacksonville game, originally scheduled for 1:00 p.m. ET, was flexed to 4:15 p.m. ET on CBS.

Week 12: The Carolina–Atlanta game, originally scheduled for 1:00 p.m. ET, was flexed to 4:15 p.m. ET on Fox.

Week 14: The Washington–Baltimore game, originally scheduled for 1:00 p.m. ET on Fox, was flexed into NBC Sunday Night Football at 8:15 p.m. ET, replacing the New England–Seattle game, which was moved to 4:05 p.m. ET on CBS.

Week 15: The Denver–Carolina and Pittsburgh–Baltimore games, originally scheduled for 1:00 p.m. ET, was flexed to 4:15 p.m. ET on CBS.

Week 16: 
 The Carolina–New York Giants game, originally scheduled for 1:00 p.m. ET on Fox, was flexed into NBC Sunday Night Football at 8:15 p.m. ET, replacing the San Diego–Tampa Bay game, which was moved to 1:00 p.m. ET on CBS.
 The Atlanta–Minnesota and Philadelphia–Washington games, originally scheduled for 1:00 p.m. ET, was flexed to 4:15 p.m. ET on Fox.

Week 17: 
 The Denver–San Diego game, originally scheduled for 4:15 p.m. ET on CBS, was flexed into NBC Sunday Night Football at 8:15 p.m. ET.
 The Jacksonville–Baltimore and Miami–New York Jets games, originally scheduled for 1:00 p.m. ET, was flexed to 4:15 p.m. ET on CBS.
 The Dallas–Philadelphia game, originally scheduled for 1:00 p.m. ET, was flexed to 4:15 p.m. ET on Fox.

Regular season standings

Division

Conference

Postseason

The playoffs began with Wild Card Weekend on January 3–4, 2009. The Divisional Playoffs were played on January 10–11 and the Conference Championship Games on January 18. Super Bowl XLIII was played on February 1 at Raymond James Stadium in Tampa, Florida, with the Pittsburgh Steelers winning their record sixth Super Bowl.

Playoffs bracket

Notable events

Detroit Lions going 0–16

The 2008 Detroit Lions would mark the capstone of the ill decisions of President/General Manager Matt Millen since arriving on the job in 2001. After an 0–3 start, the Lions fired Millen on September 23 after seven seasons, during the team's bye week. During that time, the Lions compiled the worst record in the league (31–84, .270 percentage) and had many questionable draft choices.

However, by that point, the damage had been done. The Lions went on to lose every game and finished 0–16, the first winless season in the NFL since the strike-shortened 1982 NFL season saw the Baltimore Colts finish 0–8–1, and the first full-season imperfect season since the expansion 1976 Tampa Bay Buccaneers finished 0–14. It marked the first time that a non-expansion team, non-strike shortened team, non-merged team finished winless since the 1944 Brooklyn Tigers finished 0–10. It was the second winless season for the Lions, who finished 0–11 in 1942. The 0–16 record would be later matched by the 2017 Cleveland Browns.

Retirement/Unretirement of Brett Favre
The 2008 season marked the first time since September 20, 1992, that someone other than Brett Favre started at quarterback for the Green Bay Packers, as Aaron Rodgers became the new offensive "Leader of The Pack." At first, this was given Favre's announcement on March 4, 2008, that he would retire from the league after seventeen seasons. He owns many NFL records, including most wins as a quarterback, most touchdowns thrown, (broken by Peyton Manning in 2014) and most consecutive starts at quarterback, as well as most interceptions. He started every Packers game, regular season and postseason, for nearly sixteen full seasons (September 27, 1992 – January 20, 2008).

The Packers were scheduled to retire Favre's #4 jersey in a ceremony during the first week of the season. However, on July 2, 2008, he publicly indicated that he wanted to play again as the starting quarterback. On July 11, 2008, Favre sent a letter to the Packers management asking for an unconditional release which will allow him to play for another team. The Packers did not give it to him, but they were unwilling to release him for fear that he would sign with division rival Minnesota Vikings (Favre's choice for an alternate team). Also, the Packers would not start him as quarterback if he came back to the team, and named the other Packers quarterback Aaron Rodgers as the starting quarterback and Favre as the backup.

From July 14 to 15, Favre did TV interviews discussing his comeback, Rodgers taking his place, and frustrations on the Packers for not being honest with him, personally and publicly.

On July 16, 2008, the Packers filed tampering charges against the Vikings for alleged improper communication between Favre, Vikings head coach Brad Childress and Vikings offensive coordinator Darrell Bevell. Favre filed for reinstatement on July 29, 2008, and by August 4, NFL Commissioner Roger Goodell reinstated Favre.

Three days later on August 7, the Packers traded Favre to the New York Jets for a conditional draft pick. He played well for most of the year, but entering December he suffered a shoulder injury which dropped the Jets out of playoff contention. Favre again retired following the 2008 season. The Jets then released Favre in favor of moving in the direction of getting a star college quarterback in the draft, eventually landing Mark Sanchez. Another protracted "will he/won’t he retire’ saga emerged in 2009 which concluded in August of that year when Favre signed with, as expected, the Minnesota Vikings.

Hurricane Ike

Hurricane Ike forced several changes to the 2008 schedule. The Houston Texans' Week 2 home game against the Baltimore Ravens was first postponed to Monday, September 15, before Ike made landfall; damage to Reliant Stadium forced a further postponement, to Week 10, on Sunday, November 9, giving the Texans and the Ravens their bye weeks in Week 2. Furthermore, to accommodate this move, the Texans’ home game against the Cincinnati Bengals was moved forward from November 9 to Sunday, October 26, pushing the Bengals’ bye week from Week 8 to Week 10. Although no other games were postponed, Ike and its remnants also impacted several other Week 2 games on September 14.

The Texans ended up having to wait until Week 5 against the Indianapolis Colts to have their home opener, the latest an NFL team went into the season before playing at home since the New Orleans Saints played their entire schedule on the road in 2005 due to the damages of the city of New Orleans as a result of Hurricane Katrina. (Every other NFL team had at least one home game by the end of Week 2.) With the Ravens eventually advancing to the AFC Championship Game against the rival Pittsburgh Steelers (and having to enter the playoffs as a wild card team), the impromptu decision to give the Ravens and Texans their bye week so early in the season ended up having the unintended effect of the Ravens playing in an NFL-record 18 consecutive weeks without a break in the schedule.

New formations result in high scores
The 2008 season saw a marked increase in the use of two new offensive philosophies (at least for the NFL, these offenses previously saw extensive use in college or Canadian football for a few years): the "wildcat formation," a formation based on the halfback option play, the "spread offense," which uses multiple wide-receiver sets and the quarterback frequently in shotgun, and the "Suggs package," which features two quarterbacks on the field at once. In week 3 of the season, the wildcat formation, used up until this point primarily as a trick play, was used eight times, including four times in a Miami Dolphins game and three times in a game between the Oakland Raiders and Buffalo Bills. Season-ending injuries to the starting and backup quarterbacks for the Chiefs prompted the team's offensive coordinator Chan Gailey to switch to a spread offense after six games. In Baltimore, the Ravens, led by rookie head coach John Harbaugh, implemented the "Suggs package", which places two quarterbacks on the field at once, Joe Flacco and Troy Smith. Due mainly to the new formations, 837 points were scored league wide in Week 12, the most ever for one NFL weekend. The wildcat formation in particular was credited with turning the Miami Dolphins from a last-place team into the winner of the AFC East, and four of the top ten plays ranked by NFL.com were directly based on the wildcat (two others featured wide receivers throwing passes).

Tie game
On November 16, during Week 11, a game between the Philadelphia Eagles and the Cincinnati Bengals at Paul Brown Stadium ended in a 13–13 tie, the first NFL tie game since November 10, 2002, when the Atlanta Falcons and the Pittsburgh Steelers ended in a 34–34 draw. After the game, Donovan McNabb mentioned that he did not know there were ties in the NFL, apparently confusing the NFL's postseason rules (where teams can and have played double overtime games because those contests continue until a team finally wins) with the regular season rules. This drew the ire of many fans, who thought that a quarterback of his caliber should know some fundamental rules; however, none of McNabb's critics accused him of not playing to win during the overtime period in Cincinnati, and his play was tied into a game that was widely derided as one of the ugliest, most disjointed, and controversial results in NFL history.

Ironically, the tie game ultimately helped the Eagles make the playoffs, as it was the deciding tiebreaker for the #6 seed in the NFC; the Eagles went on to lose to the Cardinals in the NFC Championship Game.

Tributes

St. Louis Rams and Georgia Frontiere
On January 18, 2008, Georgia Frontiere, owner of the St. Louis Rams died due to complications with breast cancer. The Rams wore a commemorative patch in her honor, with her signature on their left shoulder.

Kansas City Chiefs and Lamar Hunt
On January 31, 2008, Clark Hunt, chairman of the board for the Kansas City Chiefs announced that henceforth the team's Lamar Hunt/American Football League tribute patch that was introduced in the 2007 season will be a permanent part of the Chiefs’ uniform. joining the Chicago Bears (with George Halas) and the Cleveland Browns (with Al Lerner) with such a patch.

Tim Russert
The stretch of highway outside Ralph Wilson Stadium along U.S. Route 20A in Orchard Park, New York, has been named the Timothy J. Russert Highway. Russert, who was NBC News's chief Washington bureau correspondent and the host of Meet the Press, was a Buffalo native and noted Buffalo Bills fan. He died of a heart attack in June 2008.

Gene Upshaw
The league honored National Football League Players Association leader Gene Upshaw, who died suddenly at age 63 on August 20 just three days after being diagnosed with pancreatic cancer. For the entire season, the Oakland Raiders wore a patch on the left chest of the jerseys with the initials "GU" and his number 63, his jersey number with the Raiders. All NFL teams also honored Upshaw with a video tribute and a replica of the uniform patch painted onto the field during the opening weekend. Originally, the patch on the field and the video tribute were only going to be done in Oakland at the Raiders' home opener against the Denver Broncos as Upshaw played his entire 15-year Hall of Fame career with the Raiders, and at Giants Stadium, when the Giants and Redskins opened the NFL season on September 4. All players wore the same patch during Week One, and later changed to a smaller helmet decal. The Raiders wore the patch through the remainder of the season.

Sean Taylor
The Washington Redskins honored the anniversary of death of Sean Taylor this season in a home game against the visiting New York Giants.

Steelers ownership restructure

On July 7, 2008, owners of the Pittsburgh Steelers, including Art Rooney's five sons who own 80% of the franchise, looked to restructure the ownership plan of the franchise in order to comply with NFL ownership regulations. Current Steelers Chairman, Dan Rooney, and his son, Art Rooney II, President of the franchise, wished to stay involved with the franchise, while the remainder of the brothers – Art Jr., Timothy, Patrick and John – wished to further pursue racetracks that they own in Florida and New York. Since 2006, many of the racetracks have added video slot machines, causing them to violate "NFL policy that prohibits involvement with racetrack and gambling interests". On July 11, it was confirmed that investor Stanley Druckenmiller had been in discussion with the five Rooney brothers. A Steelers fan for many years, Druckenmiller "has been known to paint his face black and gold" during games. Coach Mike Tomlin stated that the situation could become a distraction, but "I'm here to coach, they're [the players] here to play. Those questions will be answered by the Rooneys." On September 18, Druckenmiller withdrew his bid to purchase the team.

NFL owners unanimously approved the restructuring of ownership on December 17, 2008, with Dan and Art II getting the mandated 30% stake. Meanwhile, brothers Timothy and Patrick (the ones who own race tracks with slot machines, which violate NFL ownership rules) sold their shares outright, while Art Jr., John, and the McGinley family selling some shares but retaining smaller ownership roles, with the brothers reducing their shares from 16% to 6% and the McGinley family reducing their shares from 20% to 10%. Joining the ownership group were Pilot Travel Centers president Jim Haslam III, Legendary Pictures president and CEO Thomas Tull, and the Paul family each getting a 16% stake in the team. Dan Rooney mentioned he has no ill will towards Druckenmiller, mentioning he's a great Steelers fan and wishes he remains one.

Milestones
The following teams and players set all-time NFL records during the regular season:

Regular season statistical leaders

Awards

Regular season awards

All-Pro team

Team superlatives

Offense
Most points scored: New Orleans, 463
Fewest points scored: Cleveland, 204
Most total offensive yards: New Orleans, 6,571
Fewest total offensive yards: Cincinnati, 3,926
Most total passing yards: New Orleans, 4,977
Fewest total passing yards: Oakland, 2,369
Most rushing yards: New York Giants, 2,518
Fewest rushing yards: Arizona, 1,178

Defense
Fewest points allowed: Pittsburgh, 223
Most points allowed: Detroit, 517
Fewest total yards allowed: Pittsburgh, 3,795
Most total yards allowed: Detroit, 6,470
Fewest passing yards allowed: Pittsburgh, 2,511
Most passing yards allowed: Seattle, 4,149
Fewest rushing yards allowed: Minnesota, 1,230
Most rushing yards allowed: Detroit, 2,754

Players of the Week

AFC

NFC

Coaching changes
The following teams hired new head coaches prior to the start of the 2008 season:

The following head coaches were fired during the 2008 season:

The firing of Kiffin and Linehan marked the first time since the AFL–NFL merger in 1970 that multiple head coaches were fired before Week 5 of the season, and the first since 1989 that any coach was fired this early in a season. Both were released heading into their teams’ respective bye weeks, while Nolan was released prior to the game just before the 49ers’ bye.

Stadium changes
In addition to the Bills playing one home game in Toronto's Rogers Centre, this was the first season that the Indianapolis Colts played their home games at Lucas Oil Stadium.

2008 was the final year that the Dallas Cowboys played at Texas Stadium; they moved to Cowboys Stadium in Arlington, Texas, in 2009.

McAfee Coliseum reverted to the Oakland Coliseum after McAfee declined to renew the naming rights. In addition, Monster Park reverted to Candlestick Park permanently after the naming right deal with Monster Cable expired, per the terms of Proposition H, passed by San Francisco voters in 2004, that prohibited the city from accepting another naming rights deals for that stadium.

Uniforms
The Tennessee Titans switched their home jerseys.  They changed their alternate Columbia blue jersey to make it their primary color while the navy blue jersey became the alternate jersey.

The Denver Broncos brought back the alternate orange jerseys after a three-year hiatus and wore them for games against the New Orleans Saints and Kansas City Chiefs.

In their first two home games, the New England Patriots wore their white jerseys against the Kansas City Chiefs and Miami Dolphins.  It was the first time the Patriots had worn white at home since 1994.

For the first time in the team's history, the Oakland Raiders wore their white jerseys at home against the San Diego Chargers.

New league logo
2008 was the first season that the NFL used a new, updated logo.  Unveiled on August 31, 2007, in USA Today, the new design features eight white stars, representing each of the league's eight divisions, instead of 25 on the old logo.  The football has been redesigned and rotated to the same angle as the one on the top of the Vince Lombardi Trophy given to the Super Bowl champion.  Darker shades of red and blue, specifically navy blue, are also used, along with font lettering to that of the league's current typeface for other logos.  The new logo officially made its debut during the 2008 NFL Draft on April 26.

Apparel
The 2008 season marked just the third time in the salary cap era (and first since 2001) that no NFL team made major changes to their uniforms or logo. Since 1993, half of the league's teams (Arizona, Atlanta, Buffalo, Cincinnati, Denver, Minnesota, New England, New York Giants, New York Jets, Philadelphia, San Diego, San Francisco, Seattle, St. Louis, Tampa Bay, and Tennessee) have completely redesigned their uniforms (The Patriots doing it four times, though none since 2000) while another five (Detroit, Green Bay, Miami, New Orleans, and Pittsburgh) making minor, though noticeable, changes. The Titans are swapping home and alternate designations on their light blue and navy blue jerseys though.

The Detroit Lions, in celebration of their 75th season in Motown as well as by popular demand by the fans, abandoned their black third jerseys in favor of their 1950s style throwback uniforms. They wore these uniforms against Jacksonville (November 9) and Tennessee (Thanksgiving Day – November 27). In addition, the Pittsburgh Steelers will make their throwbacks from the previous season their alternate uniform, wearing them against the Baltimore Ravens on September 29 and the New York Giants on October 26. The Jets wore their New York Titans throwbacks at home against Arizona on September 28 and Cincinnati on October 12 this season, and the Bills donned their retro uniforms at home against Oakland Raiders September 21.

Media

Television

This was the third season under the league's television contracts with its American broadcast partners. CBS Sports and Fox Sports televised Sunday afternoon AFC and NFC away games, respectively. For primetime games, NBC broadcast Sunday Night Football and ESPN airs Monday Night Football. The NFL Network's Run to the Playoffs also broadcast seven Thursday and one Saturday late season night games, although there were reportedly negotiations to move those games to ESPN Classic.
This was also the last NFL season to be broadcast over the air in analog television in the United States; the digital television transition occurred in June 2009. Border stations in Canada and Mexico will continue to broadcast in analog; cable stations are unaffected and will be distributed in the format of the cable provider's choice.

NBC broadcast Super Bowl XLIII, their first Super Bowl since Super Bowl XXXII at the end of the 1997 season.

Changes
ESPN reduced the on-air roles of sideline reporters Michele Tafoya and Suzy Kolber during the Monday Night Football telecast. Also, Emmitt Smith has been replaced on Sunday NFL Countdown by Cris Carter, who came over from HBO.

Meanwhile, NBC's Football Night in America reunited Dan Patrick with Keith Olbermann on television for the first time since 1997 when they co-hosted SportsCenter. At Fox NFL Sunday, former New York Giants defensive end Michael Strahan joined the show as an analyst.

The in-house NFL Network saw Bryant Gumbel resign as their play-by-play announcer after two seasons on the network's Run to the Playoffs package after critics described his play-by-play calling as "lackluster." New York Giants radio announcer Bob Papa took his place.

Additionally, NFL Films-produced Inside the NFL changed premium cable homes from Time Warner's HBO after three decades to CBS’ Showtime. Also changed: James Brown (from the parent network's The NFL Today) as host and Phil Simms as one of the analysts. Cris Collinsworth is staying, but Dan Marino has been dropped as a studio analyst, and the aforementioned Cris Carter moved to ESPN. Taking their place is Warren Sapp.

3-D Telecast
On December 4, the NFL Network broadcast its game between the Oakland Raiders and the San Diego Chargers to theaters in New York City, Boston and Los Angeles using state of the art 3-D technology. The viewings, which were limited to NFL and consumer electronics executives, served as a test for future use of 3D in NFL television games. Because of a technical glitch, the first half was not shown.

Radio
On radio, Westwood One separated from its longtime corporate sister, CBS Radio and the Sports USA Radio Network, another syndicator, has been sold along with parent company Jones Radio Networks to the Triton Media Group..  This led to the former "NFL on Westwood One" giving way in 2011 to "NFL on Dial Global".

Internet television
On Internet television, both NFL.com and NBCSports.com carried complete live games of NBC Sunday Night Football for the first time ever. NFL.com continued its live coverage of Thursday and Saturday Night Football, which began in 2007, however for the first time the complete game rather than live look-ins was shown.

Home video
The Pittsburgh Steelers 2008 season/Super Bowl XLIII championship home video went on sale on DVD on February 24, 2009. One week later on March 3, it was released on Blu-ray Disc, making it the first NFL Films home video release to be on Blu-ray Disc. The Blu-ray copy is "officially" sold exclusively through Amazon.com, though it is also available through the Sports Illustrated Super Bowl offer as well as eBay. Among its exclusive content included having most of the features in high-definition video as well as the NFL on Fox fourth-quarter coverage of the Steelers matchup against the Dallas Cowboys at Heinz Field in its entirety. The matchup, which took place during Week 14 and renewed the rivalry the two teams had in the 1970s & 1990s, saw the Steelers come back from a 4th quarter ten-point deficit to win 20–13.

The New York Giants 2007 season/Super Bowl video was only released on DVD the previous year despite the fact that Toshiba dropped support of HD DVD (the primary rival of Blu-ray) just two weeks after Super Bowl XLII.

See also
Super Bowl XLIII
2008 NFL Draft

External links
2008 NFL season at NFL.com
Football Outsiders 2008 DVOA Rankings

References

 
National Football League seasons